Growdon Mansion, also known as Trevose Manor, is a local historical landmark in Bensalem Township, Pennsylvania, United States. It played an important role in early Bucks County history. The mansion sits along the Neshaminy Creek in Bensalem, a township that borders the northeast section of Philadelphia, in the northeastern United States.

History
In 1683 Joseph Growden settled on this land and built "The Manor of Bensalem" for their family. Joseph Growden had a son, Lawrence Growden, born on March 14, 1693. He then had two daughters, Elizabeth who married Thomas Nickleson of Philadelphia, and Grace Galloway who married Joseph Galloway, a loyalist politian. Grace and Joseph Galloway inherited the land on October 18, 1753, and inherited three tracts of land, Trevose, Belmont (Bensalem, Pennsylvania), and Richelieu in Bensalem township containing a total of 1,425 acres and four tracts in Durham Township containing iron mines and furnaces. The Growdens also acquired property in Bristol (as Lawrence Growden was named the Merchant of Bristol in 1730) and Philadelphia, from Front to 4th Streets, along Lombard St.

Since women could not own property during that time, Joseph Galloway became the sole proprietor. Joseph Galloway, a Tory (British Loyalist), left for England mid-war to seek sanctuary once the war turned in favor of the Colonists. Joseph took their daughter Elizabeth with him to England, and Grace stayed behind to wage an extensive fight to retain the properties in which they (she) had inherited. She kept an in-depth diary of the struggles and hardships that she faced and was particularly concerned with the descent from financial and social standing both in her husband's absence and upon being forcibly evicted from her home in August 1778. She had refused to submit to the condition of acknowledging the Patriot rule and renounce her Loyalist ties to receive a pension. A member of one of the wealthiest and most notable families of her day, her reputation was ruined by her marriage to Galloway -- it was guilt by association once he showed his Torry colors. She noted in her will that those properties should be passed on to her daughter, Elizabeth (Betsey), upon her death. Grace Growden died on February 6, 1782, and Joseph Galloway died on August 29, 1803. Their daughter Elizabeth then had inherited the land and sold it in 1848, when the house again underwent major changes.

Galloway was good friends with William Franklin, Benjamin Franklin's son. Franklin often visited him at his many estates, traveling 25 miles to Trevose from Philadelphia on horseback or by carriage. While a local legend maintains that Franklin performed his famous kite-flying experiment at Growden Mansion to prove that lightning was the same as static electricity, the broader consensus is that Franklin flew his kite closer to his home in Philadelphia. Other significant historical figures such as George Washington and John Adams have also stayed at the mansion.

Current status
The Growdon property developed over time and was considered to be one of the strongest and most unusual manors of its day. The home is now operated as a museum by the Historical Society of Bensalem Township.  It includes an outbuilding called "The Vault" where the early deeds and county records used to be stored, and the main house still has bullet holes from the Revolution pockmarking its walls.

References

 Baxter, Beverly. "Grace Growdon Galloway: Survival of a Loyalist, 1778-79." Frontiers: A 
Journal of Women Studies 3, no. 1 (1978): 62–67.
 Berkin, Carol. “Chapter 7: Beat of Drum and Ringing of Bell" Women in the American Revolution." First Generations: Women in Colonial America. Ed. Eric Foner. NY: Hill and Wang, 1996. Print. 165–166.

External links
Bensalem Historical Society - includes history of Growden Mansion

Houses in Bucks County, Pennsylvania
Houses on the National Register of Historic Places in Pennsylvania
Houses completed in 1685
Architecture in England
National Register of Historic Places in Bucks County, Pennsylvania
1685 establishments in Pennsylvania
Bensalem Township, Pennsylvania